"Can't Hang" / "Do You Want To" is Xscape's fourth single from their second studio album Off the Hook that featured rapper MC Lyte. The song reached number #50 on the Billboard Hot 100 and number #9 on Billboard's Hot R&B/Hip-Hop Singles & Tracks. It was a double A side to Do You Want To.

The song saw member Kandi taking lead vocals on most of "Can't Hang". Tiny Cottle and Latocha Scott share lead vocals on "Do You Want To".

Music video 

The video was shot in a beauty salon.

"Do You Want To" was the group's final single from the Off The Hook album which achieved moderate to low success was released on January 16, 1996 and the song sees group member "Tiny" taking the lead. The song's music video is the second (the first being Who Can I Run To) that features Tiny's ex fiancé and daughter Zonnique's father known by the nickname Z-Bo.

Charts

Weekly charts

Year-end charts

Certifications

References

1996 singles
Xscape (group) songs
Songs written by Jermaine Dupri
Song recordings produced by Jermaine Dupri
1996 songs
Songs written by Kandi Burruss
Songs written by Tameka Cottle
So So Def Recordings singles
Songs written by LaTocha Scott
1990s ballads